Isaura Santos (born 15 July 1989) is a Portuguese singer and songwriter. She composed the song "O jardim", performed by Cláudia Pascoal, that represented Portugal at the Eurovision Song Contest 2018 in Lisbon. Automatically qualified to the final, due to Portugal's first victory in the contest the year before, the song ended up in the last position.

Career
She first came known in 2010 after she participated in the fourth season of the Portuguese edition of the music talent show Operação Triunfo where achieved 8th place overall.

Personal life

In February 2020 Isaura announced she was fighting breast cancer and subsequently canceled all scheduled appearances.

Discography

Studio albums

Extended plays

Singles

As lead artist

As featured artist

References

Living people
Portuguese women singer-songwriters
1989 births
21st-century Portuguese women singers